Coqueta (in English: Coquette) is a 1983 Mexican musical drama film.

Plot 
It tells the story of Rocío (Lucerito aka Lucero), an optimistic adolescent, who finds true love in Pablo (Pedrito Fernández aka Pedro Fernández).  However, the innocent love of this pair is destroyed when Roció faints at her birthday party, which leads to the diagnosis of a grave heart defect.  In desperation, due to the possibility of losing his beloved Roció, Pablo tries to hide his sadness, and show great bravery for the well-being of the girl he adores.

Cast 
 Lucero as Rocío
 Pedro Fernández as Pablo
 Rodolfo Gómez as Ricardo
 Sergio Gómez as Luis
 Antonio de Hud as Juan
 Lucero León as Mother of Pablo

Promotion 
This movie was promoted for Mexico and Latin Countries. After its release was promoted through television.

External links 
 

Mexican musical drama films
1980s Spanish-language films
1983 films
Romantic musical films
1980s romantic musical films
1980s Mexican films